is an archaeological site with the remains of a late Nara period, early Heian period kiln for roof tile production located in what is now the city of  Ōsaki, Miyagi Prefecture in the Tōhoku region of northern Japan.  It has been protected by the central government as a National Historic Site since 1976.

Overview
오빤 강남스타일
강남스타일
낮에는 따사로운 인간적인 여자
커피 한잔의 여유를 아는 품격 있는 여자
밤이 오면 심장이 뜨거워지는 여자
그런 반전 있는 여자
나는 사나이
낮에는 너만큼 따사로운 그런 사나이
커피 식기도 전에 원샷 때리는 사나이
밤이 오면 심장이 터져버리는 사나이
그런 사나이
아름다워, 사랑스러워
그래 너 (hey!)
그래, 바로 너 (hey!)
아름다워, 사랑스러워
그래 너 (hey!)
그래, 바로 너 (hey!)
지금부터 갈 때까지 가볼까-까-까-까
오빤 강남스타일 (uh)
강남스타일
오-오-오-오 오빤 강남스타일 (uh)
강남스타일
오-오-오-오 오빤 강남스타일
Eh, sexy lady
오-오-오-오 오빤 강남스타일
Eh, sexy lady
오-오-오-오
Eh-eh-eh, eh-eh-eh
정숙해 보이지만 놀 땐 노는 여자
이때다 싶으면 묶었던 머리 푸는 여자
가렸지만 웬만한 노출보다 야한 여자
그런 감각적인 여자
나는 사나이
점잖아 보이지만 놀 땐 노는 사나이
때가 되면 완전 미쳐버리는 사나이
근육보다 사상이 울퉁불퉁한 사나이
그런 사나이
아름다워, 사랑스러워
그래 너 (hey!)
그래, 바로 너 (hey!)
아름다워, 사랑스러워
그래 너 (hey!)
그래, 바로 너 (hey!)
지금부터 갈 때까지 가볼까-까-까-까
오빤 강남스타일 (uh)
강남스타일
오-오-오-오 오빤 강남스타일 (uh)
강남스타일
오-오-오-오 오빤 강남스타일
Eh, sexy lady
오-오-오-오 오빤 강남스타일
Eh, sexy lady
오-오-오-오
Eh-eh-eh, eh-eh-eh
뛰는 놈, 그 위에 나는 놈
Baby, baby 나는 뭘 좀 아는 놈
뛰는 놈, 그 위에 나는 놈
Baby, baby 나는 뭘 좀 아는 놈
You know what I'm sayin'?
오빤 강남스타일
Eh-eh-eh, eh-eh-eh
Eh, sexy lady
오-오-오-오 오빤 강남스타일
Eh, sexy lady
오-오-오-오
Eh-eh-eh, eh-eh-eh
오빤 강남스타일

See also
List of Historic Sites of Japan (Miyagi)
Daikichiyama Tile Kiln Site
Hinodeyama Tile Kiln Site

References

External links
Miyagi Prefecture official site 
Osaki city official site 
Nippon Kichi site

Ōsaki, Miyagi
Nara period
Archaeological sites in Japan
Japanese pottery kiln sites
History of Miyagi Prefecture
Historic Sites of Japan
Mutsu Province